Beecher Falls is a census-designated place in the town of Canaan, Essex County, Vermont, United States. Beecher Falls is located on the Connecticut River across from Stewartstown, New Hampshire, in the northeast corner of Vermont. Its population was 177 as of the 2010 census.

References

External links 

Census-designated places in Vermont
Census-designated places in Essex County, Vermont